665 Sabine is a minor planet orbiting the Sun that was discovered by German astronomer Wilhelm Lorenz on July 22, 1908.

Photometric observations of this asteroid at the Oakley Observatory in Terre Haute, Indiana during 2006 gave a light curve with a period of 4.294 ± 0.001 hours and a brightness variation of 0.50 ± 0.04 in magnitude.

References

External links
 
 

Background asteroids
Sabine
Sabine
19080722